Gudachari No.1 is a 1983 Telugu-language spy film written and directed by Kodi Ramakrishna. Produced by T. Trivikrama Rao, the film stars Chiranjeevi and Raadhika in pivotal roles.

Plot
The film deals with Vijay, a C.B.I-Agent on a special operation to explore the illegal explosive manufacture, and export headed by underworld Don Supreme.

Cast 
 Chiranjeevi as Vijay
 Raadhika as Radha
 Rao Gopal Rao as Govinda Rao
 Gollapudi Maruti Rao as Veeraswamy
 Bhanu Chander
 M. Prabhakar Reddy as Ananda Murthy
 Silk Smitha
 Sakshi Ranga Rao
 Mada Venkateswara Rao
 P. L. Narayana as priest

Soundtrack

References

External links
 Gudachari No. 1 at IMDb

1983 films
1980s crime films
1980s Telugu-language films
Indian spy films
Films directed by Kodi Ramakrishna
Films scored by K. Chakravarthy
Indian crime films
Films about criminals
Films about organised crime in India